The Janssen Medal is an astrophysics award presented by the French Academy of Sciences to those who have made advances in this area of science.

The award was founded in 1886, though the first medal was not awarded until a year later. The commission formed to decide on the first recipient of the medal selected the German physicist Gustav Kirchhoff for his work on the science of spectroscopy. However, Kirchhoff died aged 63 on 17 October 1887, a few months before the award would have been announced. Rather than chose a new recipient for the award, the commission announced at the Academy's session of 26 December 1887 that the inaugural medal would be placed on his grave, in "supreme honour of the memory of this great scholar of Heidelberg".

The award had been intended to be biennial, but was awarded in 1888 and again in 1889. A statement in the 1889 volume of Comptes rendus de l'Académie des sciences clarified that the award would be presented annually for the first seven years, and then biennially from 1894 onwards.

This award is distinct from the Prix Jules Janssen (created in 1897), an annual award presented by the French Astronomical Society. Both awards are named for the French astronomer Pierre Janssen (1824–1907) (better known as Jules Janssen). Janssen founded the Academy award, and was a member of the inaugural commission.

Laureates
1887 – Gustav Kirchhoff (posthumously)
1888 – William Huggins
1889 – Norman Lockyer
1890 – Charles Augustus Young
1891 – Georges Rayet
1892 – Pietro Tacchini
1893 – Samuel Pierpont Langley
1894 – George Ellery Hale
1896 – Henri Deslandres
1898 – Aristarkh Belopolsky
1900 – Edward Emerson Barnard
1902 – Aymar de la Baume Pluvinel
1904 – Aleksey Pavlovitch Hansky
1905 – Gaston Millochau (silver-gilt award)
1906 – Annibale Ricco
1908 – Pierre Puiseux
1910 – William Wallace Campbell
1912 – Alfred Perot
1914 – René Jarry-Desloges
1916 – Charles Fabry
1918 – Stanislas Chevalier
1920 – William Coblentz
1922 – Carl Størmer
1924 – George Willis Ritchey
1926 – Francisco Miranda da Costa Lobo
1928 – William Hammond Wright
1930 – Bernard Ferdinand Lyot
1932 – Alexandre Dauvillier
1934 – Walter Sydney Adams
1936 – Henry Norris Russell
1938 – Bertil Lindblad
1940 – Harlow Shapley
1943 – Lucien Henri d'Azambuja
1944 – Jean Rösch
1946 – Jan Hendrik Oort
1949 – Daniel Chalonge
1952 – André Couder
1955 – Otto Struve
1958 – André Lallemand
1961 – Pol Swings
1964 – Jean-François Denisse
1967 – Bengt Strömgren
1970 – Gérard Wlérick
1973 – Lucienne Devan (silver-gilt award)
1976 – Paul Ledoux
1979 – Jean Delhaye
1982 – Georges Michaud
1985 – Pierre Lacroute
1988 – Lodewijk Woltjer.
1990 – Pierre Charvin
1992 – Henk C. Van de Hulst
1994 – Serge Koutchmy
1999 – Jean-Marie Mariotti
2003 – Gilbert Vedrenne
2007 – Bernard Fort
2011 – Francois Mignard
2019 – Eric Hosy

The list above is complete up to 2019.

See also

 List of astronomy awards

References

External links
 Les Prix Thematiques en Sciences de l'Univers, includes a description of the Janssen Medal (French Academy of Sciences)
 Article and photograph on the presentation of the 2007 award to Bernard Fort  (Paris Institute of Astrophysics)

Astronomy prizes
French science and technology awards
Awards of the French Academy of Sciences
1886 establishments in France
Awards established in 1886